Philippe Cornet (born March 28, 1990) is a Canadian professional ice hockey player. He is currently playing for the Kassel Huskies of the German second tier DEL2. Cornet was selected by the Edmonton Oilers in the fifth round (133rd overall) of the 2008 NHL Entry Draft.

Playing career
As a youth, Cornet played in the 2003 Quebec International Pee-Wee Hockey Tournament with the Val'd-Or Foreurs minor ice hockey team.

Prior to turning professional, Cornet played major junior hockey in the Quebec Major Junior Hockey League with Rimouski Oceanic and the Rouyn-Noranda Huskies.

On May 4, 2010, the Edmonton Oilers signed Cornet to a three-year entry-level contract.

During the 2011–12 season, Cornet made his NHL debut on January 31, 2012, skating for the Oilers in a 3-2 home game win over the Colorado Avalanche. On just his second shift, he earned an assist on a Jordan Eberle goal.

On August 7, 2013, Cornet was signed as a free agent to a one-year AHL contract with the San Antonio Rampage. He attended NHL affiliate, the Florida Panthers training camp before returning to the Rampage to start the 2013–14 season. After only 4 games with the Rampage, Cornet was reassigned to the ECHL's Cincinnati Cyclones. On November 22, 2013, he returned to the AHL after the Rampage traded Cornet to the Charlotte Checkers in exchange for Adam Brace.

On August 18, 2014, Cornet agreed to a one-year AHL contract as a free agent with the Hershey Bears.

On October 4, 2015, after going un-signed over the summer in North America, he signed as a free agent with Norwegian club, the Stavanger Oilers of the GET-ligaen. Cornet scored 23 goals and assisted on 22 others in 50 games en route to winning the Norwegian national championship.

On April 30, 2016, he signed a contract with HPK of the Finnish top-flight Liiga.

Career statistics

Awards and honours

References

External links

1990 births
Living people
Canadian ice hockey left wingers
Charlotte Checkers (2010–) players
Cincinnati Cyclones (ECHL) players
Edmonton Oilers draft picks
Edmonton Oilers players
Hershey Bears players
Oklahoma City Barons players
People from Val-d'Or
Rimouski Océanic players
Rouyn-Noranda Huskies players
San Antonio Rampage players
Stavanger Oilers players
Stockton Thunder players
Canadian expatriate ice hockey players in Norway